The 1973 Stevenage Borough Council election were the first elections to the newly created Stevenage Borough Council took place on 7 June 1973 . This was on the same day as other local elections.  The Local Government Act 1972 stipulated that the elected members were to shadow and eventually take over from the predecessor urban district council on 1 April 1974. The election resulted in Labour gaining control of the council, which it has held continuously to the present day.

Overall results

|-bgcolor=#F6F6F6
| colspan=2 style="text-align: right; margin-right: 1em" | Total
| style="text-align: right;" | 35
| colspan=5 |
| style="text-align: right;" | 15,458
| style="text-align: right;" | 
|-
|colspan="11" bgcolor=""|
|-
| style="background:"|
| colspan="10"| Labour win

Ward results

Bedwell (5 seats)

Broadwater (5 seats)

Chells (5 seats)

Old Stevenage (6 seats)

Pin Green (8 seats)

Shephall (6 seats)

References

1973
1973 English local elections
1970s in Hertfordshire